Shifa Tameer-e-Millat University (STMU) is a private university, established in 2012 in Islamabad, Pakistan. It is set up as a nonprofit institution in the private sector.

History 
The bill for the establishment of the university was passed by the National Assembly of Pakistan on 16 January 2012, and by the Senate of Pakistan on 10 February 2012. On 3 March 2012, President Asif Ali Zardari approved the Shifa Tameer-e-Millat University Act.

Faculties 
The university offers courses related to health sciences, and most recently, it started a course related to Computer Science. Shifa Tameer-e-Millat University has a teaching hospital named Shifa International Hospitals Ltd. and three faculties: Faculty of Health Sciences, Faculty of Nursing and Midwifery and Faculty of Pharmaceutical and Allied Health Sciences.

References

External links 

Private universities and colleges in Pakistan
Universities and colleges in Islamabad
Educational institutions established in 2012
2012 establishments in Pakistan
Medical colleges in Islamabad
Islamabad Capital Territory